Hugh Goldie (14 December 1923 – 24 February 1993) was a Scottish footballer who played for Dumbarton, Raith Rovers, Ayr United and Albion Rovers.

References

1923 births
1993 deaths
Scottish footballers
Dumbarton F.C. players
Raith Rovers F.C. players
Ayr United F.C. players
Albion Rovers F.C. players
Scottish Football League players
Association football forwards